Norbert Holzknecht (born 13 April 1976) is an Austrian former alpine skier.

Career
During his career he has achieved 3 results among the top 10 in the World Cup.

Europa Cup results
Holzknecht has won an overall Europa Cup and three discipline cup.

FIS Alpine Ski Europa Cup
Overall: 2003
Downhill: 1996, 1998, 2003

References

External links
 
 

1976 births
Living people
Austrian male alpine skiers
20th-century Austrian people